The Franziskanerkloster or Barfüßerkloster was a Franciscan monastery in Dresden founded in 1272. Its church (with its associated Busmannkapelle) later became the Sophienkirche.

References

Franciscan monasteries in Germany
Buildings and structures in Dresden
1272 establishments in Europe